Larestan International Airport is an airport near Lar, Iran.

Introduction
The airport began operations in 1983, although much of its destinations were domestic. After the Persian Gulf War, it became an international airport with its first international flight to Dubai, UAE.

Airlines and destinations

References

Info at IAC

See also
Gerash
Larestan

Airports in Iran
Transportation in Fars Province
Buildings and structures in Fars Province